Sheth Chimanlal Nagindas Vidyalaya  is a school and the Sheth Chimanlal Nagindas Vidyavihar (abbreviated Sheth C. N. Vidyavihar) is a group of educational institutes located within a campus in the Ambawadi area of Ahmedabad, Gujarat, India. It is one of the oldest educational institutions in Gujarat established in 1912.

History
In 1908, Sheth Chimanlal Nagindas prepared his will establishing a trust in the name of his late brother – Sheth Sarabhai Maganbhai and started a boarding school for children from the interest of the fund. He died within four months of preparing his will at the age of forty. His wife Manekba Chimanlal established Kumar Chhatralaya (Boys Hostel) on 26 April 1912 in memory of his husband.

This first institution was established at Maganbhai ni Wadi in Gheekanta. in 1921, the hostel was shifted to Sheth Ambalal Sarabhai’s bungalow, "Shantisadan" in Mirzapur. The trust established his own middle and high schools in 1926 for the hostel boys. The boys hostel again shifted from "Shantisadan" to Military bungalow in Khanpur in 1928. Chiman Chhatra Sangh, an association of hostel students, was also established in 1928. With growing needs, the Trust acquired land in Ambawadi to establish campus in 1929. The high school building was constructed and opened on 26 February 1933 and khadi was introduced as the uniform for students and staff.

In 1937, the school started admitting students other than hostel boys and Sheth C.N. Technical Centre was established to provide vocational training courses. Indumati, a daughter of Chimanlal, was elected as a member of Ahmedabad Municipal School Board in 1937. Jhinabhai Desai aka Snehrashmi joined the institute and coined the word, "Vidyavihar" for the entire campus comprising boys hostel, schools, technical institute. In 1941, the primary school was established. Shishuvihar (pre-primary school) was established in 1945 along with Kanya Chhatralaya (Girls Hostel).

In 1947, a Primary Teachers Training College was established. An art teachers’ diploma was started in 1952 which later became Fine Arts College. In 1953, Manekba and the trustee Nirmalaben died. In 1959, Derasar was constructed. Manekba Vinayvihar was established at Adalaj in 1959. In 1961, Indumati established Vyayam Vidyabhavan for training physical instructors and the first fine arts college of newly founded Gujarat state. In 1964, the high school was given special recognition of a multipurpose school and the Government of India recognized it as the special science school. As part of this recognition, technical education classes were introduced in the school in 1965. The same year Vidyaviahr Geetmala written and compiled by Bhailalbhai Shah was published.

The health centre was established in 1973 and the science and commerce higher education was started in 1976. Kalaniketan, an institute to promote Indian classical music, dance and other cultural activities in 1981. In 1985, the Chairman and Managing Trustee Indumati died and passed her home, Chandan Bungalow to the Sheth Sarabhai Maganbhai Trust Fund. C. N. Computer Centre was established at a cost of Rs. 35 lakh with all advanced facilities in 1996. The regional office of the State Bank of India is started on the campus in 1997.

Angreji Kendra, a language centre for English was established in 1999 while a new building for preprimary school was opened in 2000. C. N. Computer Centre awarded with the "3rd Computer Literacy Excellence Awards for School – 2004" by Abdul Kalam, the then President of India. A separate building is constructed for the Angreji Kendra. The building was inaugurated by Professor Yashpal; an eminent educationist and Member of Rajya Sabha. In 2010, English Medium school was established which was moved to new campus two years later. Sheth C. N. Sports Academy was opened in 2011. It has two basketball courts, five cricket practice pitches and a ground, volleyball court, three table tennis tables, handball and hockey grounds.

Campus
The campus is spread over 72 acres. It contains kindergarten to 12th grade schools, a Fine Arts College, a teachers training college, a Jain temple as well as farms and hostels.

About the school
At the entrance of the two-storeys building of the High School, stand two sculptures of the Goddess Saraswati and Pragna Paramita.

The school is a co-educational K through 12 institution. The campus has separate buildings for Kindergarten, Junior-High and High School.

The school was selected as a multipurpose school for fine arts under the Government of India scheme.

The school is based on Gandhian values and require students to wear Khadi (hand-spun cotton) clothes as their uniform. Children in all classes are encouraged to sweep and clean their own classrooms and mingle with fellow-students from diverse socio-economic backgrounds.

Apart from academics, the school encourages an all-round development of a student through cultural and sports activities. The school is known for the activities in the Prayer Hall, named after the Gujarati poet, Jhinabhai Desai alias 'Snehrashmi'.

Notable alumni and associates

 Gautam Adani, industrialist, chairman of the Adani Group
 Jhinabhai Desai, poet
 Yoseph Macwan, poet and critic
 Ramesh Sumant Mehta, environmental and sanitary engineer, former chairman of the trust
 Sudhir Mehta, industrialist, Torrent
 Pankaj Patel, industrialist, Zydus Cadila
 Ramchandra Patel, poet and novelist
 Indumati Chimanlal Sheth, daughter of founder and trustee, politician and social worker
 Malhar Thakar, actor
 Dhvanit Thaker, radio host
 Kartikeya Sarabhai, environment educationist
 Vikram Sarabhai, Indian physicist
 Priti Sengupta, poet and writer
 Rajesh Vyas, poet

References

External links

 

Schools in Ahmedabad
Educational institutions established in 1912
1912 establishments in India